Patsi Street is a street in the western part of the Greek capital city of Athens. It was named after Spyridon Patsis, a former mayor of Athens. It connects Athinon Avenue in the north with Konstantinopouleos Avenue in the south. The street also crosses Iera Odos.

Transport in Athens
Streets in Athens